Evoke is a 2005 album by the German industrial music project Wumpscut.

Track listing
 “Maiden” – 5:14
 “Churist Churist” – 3:46
 “Don’t Go” – 4:30
 “Evoke” – 5:31
 “Tomb” – 5:31
 “Hold” – 4:58
 “Krolok” – 4:37
 “Breathe” – 3:26
 “Rush” – 4:44
 “Perdition” – 4:40
 “Obsessio” – 4:42
 “Churist Churist” (Recently Deceased remix) – 4:42
 “Maiden” (Nersoton vs :w: remix) – 4:31

2005 albums
Wumpscut albums